Waldo is a town in Talladega County, Alabama, United States. It incorporated in 1972. At the 2020 census, the population was 258.

Geography
Waldo is located at  (33.393674, -86.032763).

The town is located along Alabama State Route 77 in the east central part of the state. AL-77 leads north 7 mi (11 km) to Talladega, the county seat, and southeast 18 mi (29 km) to Ashland.

Demographics

As of the census of 2000, there were 281 people, 102 households, and 74 families residing in the town. The racial makeup of the town was 55.16% White, 44.48% Black or African American, and 0.36% from two or more races.

There were 102 households, out of which 27.5% had children under the age of 18 living with them, 50.0% were married couples living together, 21.6% had a female householder with no husband present, and 26.5% were non-families. 21.6% of all households were made up of individuals, and 5.9% had someone living alone who was 65 years of age or older. The average household size was 2.75 and the average family size was 3.25.

In the town, the population was spread out, with 24.2% under the age of 18, 10.0% from 18 to 24, 25.3% from 25 to 44, 28.8% from 45 to 64, and 11.7% who were 65 years of age or older. The median age was 40 years. For every 100 females, there were 103.6 males. For every 100 females age 18 and over, there were 95.4 males.

The median income for a household in the town was $26,563, and the median income for a family was $31,750. Males had a median income of $31,364 versus $19,375 for females. The per capita income for the town was $13,743. About 19.6% of families and 17.5% of the population were below the poverty line, including 15.4% of those under the age of eighteen and 22.2% of those 65 or over.

References

Towns in Talladega County, Alabama
Towns in Alabama